Suffs is a stage musical with a book, music, and lyrics by Shaina Taub, based on suffragists and their American women's suffrage movement. It premiered Off-Broadway at The Public Theater in April 2022.

Production history 
The musical was initially going to open its world premiere production at The Public Theater on April 6, 2022, but the preview the night before as well as the opening night were cancelled due to a large number of positive COVID-19 cases among the cast. It began previews on March 13 and was initially announced to run until April 24, but has been extended three times: first to May 1, then to May 15, and most recently to May 29.

Cast and characters

Reception
The Off-Broadway production of Suffs received mixed to positive reviews. The production's cast, score, and direction received praise, but criticism was leveled at the musical's book, runtime, and overall structure. Juan A. Ramirez of Theatrely believed the musical's first act was too focused on narration and historical information, finding the second act vastly superior due to depicting vivid onstage conflict. He also felt the musical's criticism of the suffragists for excluding black women rang hollow due to it having no overall effect on the actual narrative. Raven Snook of Time Out gave the musical four stars out of five but opined that, despite efforts by the production to highlight Ida B. Wells and Mary Church Terrell, their story still felt sidelined by the overall narrative. In an overall positive review for Variety, Marilyn Stasio also found the second act superior but rushed, feeling the already nearly three-hour show could be longer to accommodate it.

Suffs was compared prior to opening night and in multiple reviews with Hamilton, which like Suffs is a historical musical that debuted in the Newman Theater at the Public, featuring Phillipa Soo in a starring role, and attracted similarly sold-out audiences. Maya Phillips, writing for The New York Times, noted that Suffs seemed to be trying to avoid potential criticisms similar to ones that had been leveled at Hamilton for its politics around women and slavery. Phillips opined this fear of leaving out information actually worked to the detriment of the story, voicing that the show felt "bloated with information". Helen Shaw of Vulture also found the Hamilton comparison "unavoidable". Shaw praised the musical's portrayal of divisions within the suffragists movement, but she felt that Taub's music and Silverman's staging lacked the variation needed to carry the story. Nevertheless, Shaw saw potential in the musical's future development: "Just a few amendments to go, and, like a certain Constitution I could mention — it might be truly great."

See also
 Shoulder to Shoulder (1974 series)
 Iron Jawed Angels (2004 film)
 Suffragette (2015 film)

References

External links 
 
 Official website

 

2022 musicals
Progressive Era in the United States
National Woman's Party
Alice Paul
Biographical musicals
Musicals inspired by real-life events
Off-Broadway musicals
Sung-through musicals
Biographical plays about politicians
Cultural depictions of Woodrow Wilson
Biographical plays about activists